Fate is a 2001 Turkish drama film directed and screen-written by Zeki Demirkubuz based on Albert Camus' 1942 novel L'Étranger. It was screened in the Un Certain Regard section at the 2002 Cannes Film Festival.

Cast 
 Emrah Elçiboğa
 Engin Günaydın as Necati
 Demir Karahan as Naim
 Feridun Koç
 Serdar Orçin as Musa
 Zeynep Tokuş as Sinem

References

External links 
 Official Site
 
 TurkishFilmChannel page for the film

2001 films
2000s Turkish-language films
2001 drama films
Golden Orange Behlül Dal Jury Special Award winners
Films based on works by Albert Camus
Films directed by Zeki Demirkubuz
Films set in Turkey
Films based on French novels
Turkish drama films